Ginzangawa Dam is a gravity dam located in Yamagata Prefecture in Japan. The dam is used for flood control. The catchment area of the dam is  km2. The dam impounds about 6  ha of land when full and can store 263 thousand cubic meters of water. The construction of the dam was completed in 1963.

References

Dams in Yamagata Prefecture
1963 establishments in Japan